Alexander V. Balatsky (born 19 October 1961) is a USSR-born American physicist. He is the professor of theoretical physics at NORDITA and University of Connecticut. He served as the founding director of the Institute for Materials Science (IMS) at Los Alamos National Laboratory in 2014–2017.

Biography
Born in Pushkin, USSR he was educated in Russia, being made  Master of Science at Moscow Physical-Technology Institute in 1984 and Doctor of Philosophy at the Landau Institute for Theoretical Physics in 1987. He moved to the United States in 1989 as a
postdoctoral fellow at the University of Illinois in 1989–1990 after which he was appointed a research assistant professor position at the University of Illinois at Urbana Champaign. He then moved to Los Alamos National Laboratory as an Oppenheimer Fellow. As an acting chief scientist and as a theory thrust leader he was actively involved in bringing up the Center of Integrated Nanotechnology (CINT)  and building an active theory program at CINT.

In 2011 Balatsky was appointed as a professor of theoretical condensed matter physics at Nordita in Stockholm. In 2014 he returned to the US to become Director of the new Institute for Functional Materials at Los Alamos.

Work
Balatsky is known for his contributions to the theory of High-temperature superconductivity, and mechanism of superconducting paring known as Spin Fluctuation Theory.

According to this theory, the pairing wave function of the cuprate HTS should have a dx2-y2 symmetry.  The same spin fluctuation mechanism is likely responsible for the superconducting pairing in Heavy fermion superconductors and in Fe based superconductors.
Balatsky recently worked on anomalous mechanical properties of solid He4
as an alternative explanation of supersolidity seen in torsional oscillator experiments, on theory of Heavy Fermions, and on electronic and structural properties of DNA and Graphene hybrid structures

Balatsky and collaborators predicted the existence of the impurity induced resonances in d-wave superconductors that can serve as markers of unconventional superconductivity, and Impurity-induced states in conventional and unconventional superconductors.

He also proposed the notion of Dirac Materials as a unifying class of materials that exhibit Dirac like excitations.

Honors and awards
He was elected as a Fellow of the American Physical Society in 2003, and Los Alamos Fellow in 2005. In Nov 2011, he was elected a fellow of the American Association for the Advancement of Science Fellow

References

1961 births
Living people
People from Pushkin, Saint Petersburg
21st-century American physicists
Fellows of the American Physical Society
Fellows of the American Association for the Advancement of Science